Taung Kalat is a Buddhist monastery and temple complex located on Mount Popa in Mandalay Region, Myanmar. The site is built on a tall volcanic plug, and is one of several prominent nat spiritual sites in the vicinity of nearby Mount Popa.

Description 
The temple complex is located on top of a  volcanic plug; this rock formation was formed by geologic activity around Mount Popa, an inactive volcano. The site is a popular pilgrimage destination, and is considered a source of nat spiritual energy. The 777 steps leading up to the monastery were once maintained by U Khandi, a famous Burmese hermit.

External links 
 The Best photo and videos about Popa Taung Kalat

References 

Buddhist temples in Myanmar